Anthony Byrne (born 13 September 1941) is an Irish former footballer who played as an inside right.

He joined Shamrock Rovers in 1960, and scored twice as Rovers beat Red Star Belgrade 5–1 in July 1961 in New York City .

Byrne played once in the European Champion Clubs' Cup for Rovers.

He shared a benefit game with Tommy Farrell in May 1965 .

Byrne signed for Shelbourne in 1965 and later played for Transport F.C.

In September 1982 Byrne bought Shelbourne Football Club Limited.

Honours
League of Ireland: 1
  Shamrock Rovers F.C. - 1963/64
FAI Cup: 1
  Shamrock Rovers - 1964
League of Ireland Shield: 3
 Shamrock Rovers - 1962/63, 1963/64, 1964/65
Leinster Senior Cup: 1
 Shamrock Rovers - 1964
Dublin City Cup: 1
 Shamrock Rovers - 1963/64

Sources 
 The Hoops by Paul Doolan and Robert Goggins

Association footballers from Dublin (city)
Republic of Ireland association footballers
Shamrock Rovers F.C. players
Shelbourne F.C. players
League of Ireland players
Living people
Place of birth missing (living people)
1941 births
Transport F.C. players
Association football inside forwards